Shastasauridae is an extinct family of Triassic ichthyosaurs that includes the genera Shastasaurus, Shonisaurus and Himalayasaurus. Many other Triassic ichthyosaurs have been assigned to Shastasauridae in the past, but recent phylogenetic analyses suggest that these species form an evolutionary grade of early ichthyosaurs rather than a true clade or evolutionary grouping that can be called Shastasauridae. Shastasauridae was named by American paleontologist John Campbell Merriam in 1895 along with the newly described genus Shastasaurus. In 1999, Ryosuke Motani erected the clade Shastasauria to include Shastasaurus, Shonisaurus, and several other traditional shastasaurids, defining it as a stem-based taxon including "all merriamosaurians more closely related to Shastasaurus pacificus than to Ichthyosaurus communis." He also redefined Shastasauridae as a node-based taxon including "the last common ancestor of Shastasaurus pacificus and Besanosaurus leptorhynchus, and all its descendants" and Shastasaurinae, which Merriam named in 1908, as a stem taxon including "the last common ancestor of Shastasaurus and Shonisaurus, and all its descendants." In an alternative classification scheme, paleontologist Michael Maisch restricted Shastasauridae to the genus Shastasaurus and placed Shonisaurus and Besanosaurus in separate families, Shonisauridae and Besanosauridae, respectively.

In 2018, Dean Lomax, de la Salle, Judy Massare, and Ramues Gallois identified the Lilstock specimen as a shastasaurid. While its incompleteness made the size of the animal difficult to suggest, it clearly was very large.

Feeding Habits
Unlike other Triassic ichthyosaurs, which fed almost exclusively on cephalopods, shastasaurians fed on a variety of prey. Evidence for this prey diversity includes gut contents from Guizhouichthyosarus tangae, Shonisaurus popularis, and an unnamed specimen from the Brooks Range of Alaska.

References

Ichthyosaurs
Triassic ichthyosaurs
Triassic reptiles of North America
Triassic California
Fossils of the United States
Paleontology in California
Prehistoric reptile families